Christina Kalogerikou (24 February 1885 – 3 November 1968) was an actress which she was awarded for her work in the theatre. She is descended from an acting family and acted at the National Theatre.

Biography

Christina Kalogerikou was born in 1885 and was the daughter of Pantelis Roussos and his wife Elpiniki. The two sisters, Evangelia and Anthi did a great career in the characterists of the Greek theatre. Anthi was the first wife of Nikos Miliadis, father of celebrated actor Takis Miliadis.

She married Nikolaos Koukoulas and afterwards married her second husband Panos Kalogerikos. It is believed that she married Marios Paleologos.

She was decorated as actor with Taxiarchis Evpiias. Kalogerikou died in 1968.

Artwork presentation

She played mostly in roles at the National Theatre. After World War II, she left and starred herself in movies with her most popular role was the mother of Giorgos Foudas and the noted father in-law of Melina Mercouri in Stella by Michael Cacoyannis, she starred in To Amaxaki in 1955 by Dinos Dimopoulos, she played a part in the bankrupt leader, on the side of Orestis Makris and Vasilis Avlonitis.

Filmography

Sources
Antonis Prekas, Like the Old Cinema (Σαν Παλιό Σινεμά = San Palio Sinema), ''Syghronoi Orizontes', 2003 pg 197-98

External links

Christina Kalogerikou at pipl.com

1885 births
1968 deaths
Greek actresses